A. salicifolia may refer to:

 Ajuga salicifolia, a plant species in the genus Ajuga
 Appendicula salicifolia J.J.Sm., Bot. Jahrb. Syst. 65: 482 (1933), an orchid species in the genus Appendicula
 Ateleia salicifolia, a legume species found only in Cuba
 Azara salicifolia, a plant species

Synonyms
 Allamanda salicifolia, a synonym for Allamanda cathartica, a plant species

See also
 Salicifolia (disambiguation)